Kristian House (born 6 October 1979 in Canterbury, England) is a British former racing cyclist who rode for the  team from 2008 to 2015, and joined  in 2016. He was the 2009 British Road Race Champion. He has raced in Europe and Australia. He rode for Great Britain in UCI World Cup track events.

Kristian House was born in Britain but moved to the United States as a child, growing up initially in New Jersey and then Austin, Texas, where he began racing as a junior. At 17 he began racing in Belgium, where he stayed for two-and-a-half years. He was selected for the Great Britain Under-23 squad at the UCI Road World Championships in 2000 and 2001, although he did not compete in 2000 after crashing out of Paris-Tours at the same corner as Jan Ullrich. After considering retiring from the sport at the age of 23 due to not securing a professional contract, he joined the Team GB track endurance squad after being introduced to team coach Simon Jones by John Herety, the manager of the British road team.

After representing Britain in road and track world championships, he concentrated on road-racing in 2006 after joining the Recycling.co.uk team, now managed by Herety, and won ten races in Europe and Tasmania. They included Ireland's FBD Insurance Rás, where he overhauled Danny Pate.

In 2009 House became national road race champion in Abergavenny, having finished in the top five six times previously: initially joining the breakaway to provide anticipated support to his planned team leaders for the race, Chris Newton and Tom Southam, House was part of a trio alongside Dan Lloyd and Peter Kennaugh that caught race leader Chris Froome with 800 metres to go, before House won the sprint for the line. He remained with the Rapha Condor team until 2016, when he joined . In April 2017 he announced that he would retire from competition at the end of the season. In December of that year, JLT-Condor announced that House would be rejoining the team for the following year, taking up a role as the team's performance manager.

House was granted the Freedom of the City of London in 2014.

Major results

2000
 1st Stars of Tomorrow Road Race
 1st Essen–Diksmuide
 1st Tielt
 1st Wervik
 1st Hollian
 2nd Geluveld
 2nd Westkerke
 3rd Poperinge
 3rd Leke–Diksmuide
2001
 1st Nieuwekerken
 1st Rumbeke
 1st GP Harelbeke
 1st Boezinge
 2nd Chase Classic
2002
 1st Overall Surrey 5-Day
1st Stage 2
 2nd National Individual Pursuit Championships
 3rd Castletown criterium
 5th Manx Trophy
 9th Havant International GP
2003
 1st Stage 6b Herald Sun Tour
 1st Western Australia Criterium Championships
 1st Eemegem
 2nd Castle criterium
 2nd Dougland criterium
 2nd Geeling – Botanic Gardens criterium
 3rd Armadale criterium
 3rd Nieuwekerken
 3rd National Madison Championships
 4th Overall Tour of Queensland
 5th Manx Trophy
2004
 2nd ECCA Festival senior road race
 3rd Port Arlington Bay criterium
 10th Overall Tour of Queensland
2005
 1st Bendigo criterium
 1st Kortrijk GP
 1st Overall Tour of the South
 1st KOM Cranbourne Chase stage race
 2nd Omloop Van De Grensstreek
 2nd GP Dadizele
 2nd Ingelmunster
 3rd Guildford Criterium
2006
 1st  Overall FBD Insurance Rás
1st Stage 6 (TTT)
 1st Overall Girvan cycle race
1st Stage 2
 1st Lincoln GP
 1st Stage 3 Tour de Bretagne Cycliste
 8th Overall Boucles de la Mayenne
 8th Overall Tour of Southland
1st Stage 9
2008
 2nd East Yorkshire Classic
 2nd Overall Tour of the Reservoir
 7th Overall Grand Prix Cycliste de Gemenc
 9th Overall Tour du Loir-et-Cher
2009
 1st  Road race, National Road Championships
 2nd Rochdale Grand Prix Circuit Race
 6th Overall Mi-Août Bretonne
 6th Overall Girvan Three Day
1st Points classification
 10th Overall Tour of Britain
2010
 1st Day 2 La Primavera at Lago Vista
 1st Stage 6 Tour of Japan
 1st Richmond GP
 3rd Overall Mi-Août Bretonne
2011
 1st Overall Tour of South Africa
1st Stage 1
 1st Stage 5 Vuelta Ciclista a León
 2nd Grand Prix des Marbriers
 3rd Roy Thame Cup
 6th Road race, National Road Championships
2012
 1st Durham Stage Tour Series
 1st  Mountains classification Tour of Britain
 3rd Lincoln GP
 6th Tobago Cycling Classic
2013
 1st Durham Stage Tour Series
 5th Overall Tour du Loir-et-Cher
 6th Road race, National Road Championships
 Overall Combativity award, Tour of Britain
2014
 1st Beaumont Trophy
 1st Sheffield Grand Prix
 1st Prologue (TTT) Mzansi Tour
2015
 1st Milk Race
 1st Round 4 – Motherwell, Tour Series
 5th Grand Prix des Marbriers
2016
 1st Stage 3 New Zealand Cycle Classic
 1st Stage 7 Tour de Korea

References

External links

 Kristian House interviewed by students
ProCyclingStats: /Kristian House

1979 births
Living people
Sportspeople from Canterbury
Sportspeople from Austin, Texas
English male cyclists
British cycling road race champions
Rás Tailteann winners